The Campania regional election of 2000 took place on 16 April 2000.

Antonio Bassolino (Democrats of the Left) was elected President, defeating Antonio Rastrelli (National Alliance), who had been replaced in 1999 by a centre-left ribaltone led by Andrea Losco (People's Party).

Results

References

Elections in Campania
2000 elections in Italy